The Strumica revolutionary district (Macedonian/Bulgarian: Струмички револуционерен округ/Струмишки революционен окръг) was an organizational grouping of the Bulgarian Macedonian-Adrianople Revolutionary Committees, and its successors, the Secret Macedonian-Adrianople Revolutionary Organization and the Internal Macedonian-Adrianople Revolutionary Organization. The most famous leader of the group was Hristo Chernopeev. This rebel group was active in Vardar Macedonia and Pirin Macedonia.

Strumica